Isfana Iskhak Razzakov Airport (Kyrgyz: Исхак Раззаков Исфана аэропорту, Russian: Исфанинский аэропорт имени Исхака Раззакова, Uzbek: Isfana Isxaq Razzaqov aeroporti)  is an airport serving Isfana and Sulukta, towns in  Leilek District of Batken Region (oblast) of Kyrgyzstan. The Russian IATA code for Isfana Iskhak Razzakov Airport is ИФА. Although Isfana Iskhak Razzakov Airport is near the border with Tajikistan, it has no customs and border control checks and serves only flights within Kyrgyzstan. In 2020, the airport was renamed in honor of Iskhak Razzakov who served as the first secretary of the Communist Party of the Kyrgyz SSR.

Isfana Iskhak Razzakov Airport started its operations in the 1940s as a landing strip near the town of Isfana. After Kalacha Airport, serving the coal mining town of Sulukta (16 km north of Isfana), was closed, Isfana Iskhak Razzakov Airport started serving Sulukta residents as well. The current runway and terminal were built in 1974. It is a regional class 3C airport. The runway has a weight limit of 22 tonnes, and has no instrument landing facilities and operates only during daylight hours.

In the early 1990s, Isfana Iskhak Razzakov Airport halted its operation because of technical problems. It remained closed for twenty years. In 2007, after the terminal and the track were repaired, the airport was reopened. It was temporarily closed in early 2014, but was reopened later that year. The airport was closed once again from November 2019 to June 2020 while the terminal and runway were renovated.

References

External links
 

Airports in Kyrgyzstan
Airports built in the Soviet Union
Isfana